Kottonmouth Kings: Dopeumentary is a 2001 documentary film DVD starring the Kottonmouth Kings distributed by Suburban Noize Records which was  directed and produced by Bill Wadsworth and Kevin Zinger released on May 8, 2001.

The DVD documents the making of the songs and albums by generally on the albums Royal Highness and Hidden Stash. Other than the videos viewed on this the Kottonmouth Kings are followed while on tour across California.

The DVD was re-packaged with the Hidden Stash II: The Kream of the Krop CD as Double Dose V3, the third and final Double Dose set.

References 

10 Years Deep

External links 
 

Documentary films about hip hop music and musicians
2000s English-language films